Gerasimos 'Makis' Bakadimas (born 6 June 2000) is a Greek professional footballer who plays as a centre-back for Super League club PAS Giannina.

References

2000 births
Living people
Greek footballers
Gamma Ethniki players
Super League Greece players
Panetolikos F.C. players
A.E. Messolonghi F.C. players
Anagennisi Karditsa F.C. players
PAS Giannina F.C. players
Association football defenders
People from Xiromero